The 1st North Carolina Infantry Regiment was an infantry regiment of the Confederate States Army during the American Civil War. As part of the Army of Northern Virginia it fought in the Eastern Theater until the surrender at Appomattox.

History
The 1st North Carolina Infantry was organized at the race track at Warrenton, North Carolina during the spring of 1861 and mustered in on June 3, 1861 with nearly 1600 officers and men hailing from eleven North Carolina counties. Colonel Montford S. Stokes, a son of North Carolina Governor Montfort Stokes, became its commanding officer. He served in the Navy from 1832 to 1839 and also fought as a Major with the North Carolina Volunteers during the Mexican–American War. The other field officers were Lieutenant-Colonel Matt W. Ransom and Major John A. McDowell. The regiment initially served in Department of North Carolina, and after the First Manassas was relocated to Virginia. 

The 1st North Carolina joined the Army of Northern Virginia and was brigaded under Brig. Gen. Roswell S. Ripley in the division of Maj. Gen. D.H. Hill.

On June 26, 1862 during the Battle of Beaver Dam Creek the 1st North Carolina suffered its first heavy casualties as fifty-four of their own were killed or mortally wounded and over one hundred wounded. Colonel Stokes was mortally wounded and died on July 14, 1862.

As part of the Second Corps, the 1st North Carolina participated in almost every battle the Army of Northern Virginia fought in the Eastern Theater. 

The regiment surrendered with the army at Appomattox on April 9, 1865; fielding 10 officers and 61 enlisted men.

Organization
 Company A (Albemarle Guards) – Chowan County
 Company B (Wilkes Volunteers) – Wilkes County
 Company C (Lillington Rifle Guards) – Harnett County
 Company D – Lincoln and Orange Counties
 Company E – New Hanover County
 Company F (Hertford Greys) – Hertford County
 Company G (Washington Volunteers) – Washington County
 Company H – Martin County
 Company I (Wake Light Infantry) – Wake County
 Company K – Halifax County

See also
 List of North Carolina Confederate Civil War units

References

Further reading
 Clark, Walter. Ed. Histories of the Several Regiments and Battalions from North Carolina in the Great War 1861–65. Goldsboro, North Carolina: Nash Brothers, 1901.

Units and formations of the Confederate States Army from North Carolina
1861 establishments in North Carolina